= Isle of Wight Gazette =

The Isle of Wight Gazette
- Type: Bi-weekly newspaper
- Format: Tabloid
- Owner(s): William Tudor Smith
- Publisher: The Isle of Wight Gazette
- Editor: Jason Kay
- Founded: 2008
- Ceased publication: 2011
- Headquarters: Spithead Business Centre, Newport Road, Lake
- ISSN: 2044-1312
- Website: http://www.iwgazette.co.uk

The Isle of Wight Gazette was a local newspaper. The paper edition was published on Fridays as a fortnightly publication until January 2011. It remained as an active online publication until June 2011.

The Gazette included a mix of local news, advertising features, entertainment, jobs and sport. It latterly had close links with the local Fire and Rescue Service, and often reported on traffic accidents and fires.

The newspaper was launched on 30 May 2008 as a free paper with a voluntary donation to charity. Stands were set up across the Island in over 200 locations. Between 2010 and 2011 the paper became a paid-for publication with a cover price of 30p.

Ceased Trading
The Isle of Wight Gazette Ltd ceased trading in February 2011, but the Gazette continued trading under the name of WightFM Media Group Ltd, although WightFM Media Group Ltd was at the time registered as a dissolved company.

The end of the Gazette
A controversial news story was published by the Gazette in February 2010 about Isle of Wight council Leader, David Pugh and his girlfriend at the Cowes Yacht Haven. This generated considerable publicity but did not find favour with sponsors and advertisers. The Earl Mountbatten Hospice decided to cut ties with the paper, and other advertisers withdrew. The Gazette newspaper declined after the article was published.
